Wild Wild West is a 1999 film starring Will Smith and Kevin Kline

Wild Wild West or The Wild Wild West may refer to:

Amusement parks and attractions
 Wild West Falls, formerly Wild Wild West, a log ride at Warner Bros. Movie World, Gold Coast, Australia
 The Wild Wild Wild West Stunt Show, a former attraction at Universal Studios Florida

Film and television
The Wild Wild West (film), a 1921 film starring Hoot Gibson
The Wild Wild West, the 1965 television series upon which the 1999 film Wild Wild West is based
"Wild Wild West", an episode from Family Guy
"Wild Wild West", a direct-to-video special based on the Sesame Street segment Elmo's World

Gaming
Wild Wild West: The Steel Assassin, a 1999 Microsoft Windows game based on the eponymous 1999 film
The  Wild Wild Wild West, a minigame in the 2001 video game Universal Studios Theme Parks Adventure

Music

Albums and soundtracks
 Wild Wild West (album), a 1988 album by The Escape Club
 Wild Wild West (soundtrack), the soundtrack to the 1999 film

Songs
"Wild Wild West" (Chris Cummings song) (1999)
"Wild, Wild West" (The Escape Club song) (1988)
"Wild Wild West" (Kool Moe Dee song) (1988)
"Wild Wild West" (Will Smith song) (1999)
"Wild Wild West", a 2021 song by Adele from 30

Casinos
Wild Wild West Gambling Hall & Hotel, a small casino in Las Vegas, Nevada
Thunderbird Wild Wild West Casino, a casino in Oklahoma
 Wild Wild West, a bar and casino expansion of Bally's Atlantic City in New Jersey

Other uses
 The Wild Wild West: The Night of the Iron Tyrants a comic book by Millennium Publications

See also
 Aliens in the Wild, Wild West, a 1999 film
 Wild West (disambiguation)